Sepideh is a female Persian name that means the break of dawn, morning twilight, or first lights in the sky appearing before sunrise. It is popular in Iran, Iraqi Kurdistan, Afghanistan and Tajikistan. The word Sepideh symbolizes beauty and coming of a better time after a long hard era in Persian literature as Sepideh eliminates darkness of night and indicates start of a new bright day.

The Persian word "Sepid" or "Sefid" also means "white".

Abbreviations and various forms of spelling 

 Sep
 Sepi
Sepie
 Sepee
 Sepid 
 Sepeed
 Sepide
 Sepeede
 Sepeedeh
 Ssepiedeh
 Seppy
 Cepide

Geography 
 Sepideh, Iran, a village in Isfahan Province, Iran

References to the name 

 "Sepideh", Classic Persian Song by 
 "Sepideh", Classic Song by Bahman Bashi
 "Sepideh", Song by Farshid Amin
 "Sepideh album", Classic album by Mohammad-Reza Shajarian and Mohammad-Reza Lotfi
 "Sepideh Dam", Pop Song by Javad Yasari
 "Pol-e Sepid" or "Pol-e Sefid", town in northern province of Iran
 "Div-e Sepid", legend of Mazandaran
 "Rude Sefid" or "Sefid River", river in northwestern Iran
 "Sepid Island", Iranian Island in Persian Gulf
 "Iran Sepid", Newspaper in Middle East for published in the Braille language for visually impaired Iranians.
 "Shâhigân-ǐ Sepid", Palace of Ctesiphon

Notable persons by the name 

 Sepideh, Iranian musician and pop singer
 Sepideh Raissadat, Iranian classical singer (born in Tehran, 1980)
 Sepideh Fallah, actress in Azadi
 Sepideh Mohammadian (born 1986), Iranian writer
 Sepideh Shamlou, writer
 Sepideh Moafi, actress

See also 
 Azadi, the Film
 Ctesiphon
 Div-e Sepid
 Iranian pop music
 Islamic Republic News Agency
 Sefid River
 Sepid Persian Poetry
 Islands in Iran
 List of Iranian writers

References

Given names
Persian feminine given names